The 2023 New York Mets season will be the franchise's 62nd season in Major League Baseball, their 15th at Citi Field, and their 3rd under majority owner Steve Cohen. The Mets will aim to reach the World Series for the first time since 2015 and win it all since 1986.

Offseason

Rule changes
Pursuant to the CBA, new rule changes will be in place for the 2023 season:

 institution of a pitch clock between pitches;
 limits on pickoff attempts per plate appearance;
 limits on defensive shifts requiring two infielders to be on either side of second and be within the boundary of the infield; and
 larger bases (increased to 18-inch squares);

Transactions

2022
November 9 – re-signed relief pitcher/closer Edwin Díaz to a 5-year, $102 million contract, which includes an opt-out after the 2025 season, a $20 million team option for 2028 and a full no-trade clause.
November 10 – claimed left-handed pitcher Tayler Saucedo off waivers from the Toronto Blue Jays.
November 15 – claimed right-handed pitching prospect Stephen Ridings off waivers from the New York Yankees.
November 18 – signed right-handed pitchers Jeff Brigham and Elieser Hernandez from the Miami Marlins in exchange for minor league right-hander, Franklin Sanchez, as well as Jake Mangum. The Mets also claimed right-handed pitcher William Woods off waivers from the Atlanta Braves.
 December 5 – signed three-time Cy Young Award right-handed starting pitcher Justin Verlander from the Houston Astros to a 2-year, $86.7-million contract, which includes a $35-million vesting option for 2025. The Mets also acquired left-handed pitcher Brooks Raley from the Tampa Bay in exchange for left-handed pitcher Keyshawn Askew. 
December 9 – signed right-handed relief pitcher David Robertson from the Philadelphia Phillies to a 1-year, $10-million contract. The team also signed left-handed pitcher José Quintana from the Pittsburgh Pirates to a 2-year, $26-million contract
December 10 – re-signed centerfielder Brandon Nimmo to an 8-year, $162 million contract. The team also signed right-handed pitcher Kodai Senga from the Fukuoka SoftBank Hawks to a 5-year, $75-million contract.
December 15 – signed veteran catcher Omar Narváez from the Milwaukee Brewers to a 1-year $8-million contract with a player option for 2024 worth $7-million (a deal worth up to $15-million if he exercises that option).
December 20 – re-signed right-handed relief pitcher Adam Ottavino to a 2-year, $14.5-million contract.

2023
January 14 – re-signed first baseman Pete Alonso to a 1-year, $14.5 million deal for the 2023 season to avoid salary arbitration.
January 18 – re-signed catcher Tomás Nido to a 2-year, $3.7-million contract, which covers his remaining arbitration years. He will earn $1.6-million in 2023 and $2.1-million in 2024. The Mets also signed outfielder Tommy Pham who was a free agent after his stint with the Boston Red Sox, to a 1-year, $6-million contract.
January 27 – re-signed utility player Jeff McNeil to a 4-year, $50-million contract extension which includes a club option for 2027 that could increase the total value to $63.75-million.

Regular season

Game log

|- style="background: 
| 1 || March 30 || @ Marlins || – || || || — || LoanDepot Park (–) || –
|- style="background: 
| 2 || March 31 || @ Marlins || – || || || — || LoanDepot Park (–) || –
|- style="background: 
| 3 || April 1 || @ Marlins || – || || || — || LoanDepot Park (–) || –
|- style="background: 
| 4 || April 2 || @ Marlins || – || || || — || LoanDepot Park (–) || –
|- style="background: 
| 5 || April 3 || @ Brewers || – || || || — || American Family Field (–) || –
|- style="background: 
| 6 || April 4 || @ Brewers || – || || || — || American Family Field (–) || –
|- style="background: 
| 7 || April 5 || @ Brewers || – || || || — || American Family Field (–) || –
|- style="background: 
| 8 || April 6 || Marlins || – || || || — || Citi Field (–) || –
|- style="background: 
| 9 || April 8 || Marlins || – || || || — || Citi Field (–) || –
|- style="background: 
| 10 || April 9 || Marlins || – || || || — || Citi Field (–) || –
|- style="background: 
| 11 || April 10 || Padres || – || || || — || Citi Field (–) || –
|- style="background: 
| 12 || April 11 || Padres || – || || || — || Citi Field (–) || –
|- style="background: 
| 13 || April 12 || Padres || – || || || — || Citi Field (–) || –
|- style="background: 
| 14 || April 14 || @ Athletics || – || || || — || Oakland Coliseum (–) || –
|- style="background: 
| 15 || April 15 || @ Athletics || – || || || — || Oakland Coliseum (–) || –
|- style="background: 
| 16 || April 16 || @ Athletics || – || || || — || Oakland Coliseum (–) || –
|- style="background: 
| 17 || April 17 || @ Dodgers || – || || || — || Dodger Stadium (–) || –
|- style="background: 
| 18 || April 18 || @ Dodgers || – || || || — || Dodger Stadium (–) || –
|- style="background: 
| 19 || April 19 || @ Dodgers || – || || || — || Dodger Stadium (–) || –
|- style="background: 
| 20 || April 20 || @ Giants || – || || || — || Oracle Park (–) || –
|- style="background: 
| 21 || April 21 || @ Giants || – || || || — || Oracle Park (–) || –
|- style="background: 
| 22 || April 22 || @ Giants || – || || || — || Oracle Park (–) || –
|- style="background: 
| 23 || April 23 || @ Giants || – || || || — || Oracle Park (–) || –
|- style="background: 
| 24 || April 25 || Nationals || – || || || — || Citi Field (–) || –
|- style="background: 
| 25 || April 26 || Nationals || – || || || — || Citi Field (–) || –
|- style="background: 
| 26 || April 27 || Nationals || – || || || — || Citi Field (–) || –
|- style="background: 
| 27 || April 28 || Braves || – || || || — || Citi Field (–) || –
|- style="background: 
| 28 || April 29 || Braves || – || || || — || Citi Field (–) || –
|- style="background: 
| 29 || April 30 || Braves || – || || || — || Citi Field (–) || –
|- 
 

|- style="background: 
| 30 || May 1 || Braves || – || || || — || Citi Field (–) || –
|- style="background: 
| 31 || May 2 || @ Tigers || – || || || — || Comerica Park (–) || –
|- style="background: 
| 32 || May 3 || @ Tigers || – || || || — || Comerica Park (–) || –
|- style="background: 
| 33 || May 4 || @ Tigers || – || || || — || Comerica Park (–) || –
|- style="background: 
| 34 || May 5 || Rockies || – || || || — || Citi Field (–) || –
|- style="background: 
| 35 || May 6 || Rockies || – || || || — || Citi Field (–) || –
|- style="background: 
| 36 || May 7 || Rockies || – || || || — || Citi Field (–) || –
|- style="background: 
| 37 || May 9 || @ Reds || – || || || — || Great American Ball Park (–) || –
|- style="background: 
| 38 || May 10 || @ Reds || – || || || — || Great American Ball Park (–) || –
|- style="background: 
| 39 || May 11 || @ Reds || – || || || — || Great American Ball Park (–) || –
|- style="background: 
| 40 || May 12 || @ Nationals || – || || || — || Nationals Park (–) || –
|- style="background: 
| 41 || May 13 || @ Nationals || – || || || — || Nationals Park (–) || –
|- style="background: 
| 42 || May 14 || @ Nationals || – || || || — || Nationals Park (–) || –
|- style="background: 
| 43 || May 15 || @ Nationals || – || || || — || Nationals Park (–) || –
|- style="background: 
| 44 || May 16 || Rays || – || || || — || Citi Field (–) || –
|- style="background: 
| 45 || May 17 || Rays || – || || || — || Citi Field (–) || –
|- style="background: 
| 46 || May 18 || Rays || – || || || — || Citi Field (–) || –
|- style="background: 
| 47 || May 19 || Guardians || – || || || — || Citi Field (–) || –
|- style="background: 
| 48 || May 20 || Guardians || – || || || — || Citi Field (–) || –
|- style="background: 
| 49 || May 21 || Guardians || – || || || — || Citi Field (–) || –
|- style="background: 
| 50 || May 23 || @ Cubs || – || || || — || Wrigley Field (–) || –
|- style="background: 
| 51 || May 24 || @ Cubs || – || || || — || Wrigley Field (–) || –
|- style="background: 
| 52 || May 25 || @ Cubs || – || || || — || Wrigley Field (–) || –
|- style="background: 
| 53 || May 26 || @ Rockies || – || || || — || Coors Field (–) || –
|- style="background: 
| 54 || May 27 || @ Rockies || – || || || — || Coors Field (–) || –
|- style="background: 
| 55 || May 28 || @ Rockies || – || || || — || Coors Field (–) || –
|- style="background: 
| 56 || May 30 || Phillies || – || || || — || Citi Field (–) || –
|- style="background: 
| 57 || May 31 || Phillies || – || || || — || Citi Field (–) || –
|- 
 

|- style="background: 
| 58 || June 1 || Phillies || – || || || — || Citi Field (–) || –
|- style="background: 
| 59 || June 2 || Blue Jays || – || || || — || Citi Field (–) || –
|- style="background: 
| 60 || June 3 || Blue Jays || – || || || — || Citi Field (–) || –
|- style="background: 
| 61 || June 4 || Blue Jays || – || || || — || Citi Field (–) || –
|- style="background: 
| 62 || June 6 || @ Braves || – || || || — || Truist Park (–) || –
|- style="background: 
| 63 || June 7 || @ Braves || – || || || — || Truist Park (–) || –
|- style="background: 
| 64 || June 8 || @ Braves || – || || || — || Truist Park (–) || –
|- style="background: 
| 65 || June 9 || @ Pirates || – || || || — || PNC Park (–) || –
|- style="background: 
| 66 || June 10 || @ Pirates || – || || || — || PNC Park (–) || –
|- style="background: 
| 67 || June 11 || @ Pirates || – || || || — || PNC Park (–) || –
|- style="background: 
| 68 || June 13 || Yankees || – || || || — || Citi Field (–) || –
|- style="background: 
| 69 || June 14 || Yankees || – || || || — || Citi Field (–) || –
|- style="background: 
| 70 || June 16 || Cardinals || – || || || — || Citi Field (–) || –
|- style="background: 
| 71 || June 17 || Cardinals || – || || || — || Citi Field (–) || –
|- style="background: 
| 72 || June 18 || Cardinals || – || || || — || Citi Field (–) || –
|- style="background: 
| 73 || June 19 || @ Astros || – || || || — || Minute Maid Park (–) || –
|- style="background: 
| 74 || June 20 || @ Astros || – || || || — || Minute Maid Park (–) || –
|- style="background: 
| 75 || June 21 || @ Astros || – || || || — || Minute Maid Park (–) || –
|- style="background: 
| 76 || June 23 || @ Phillies || – || || || — || Citizens Bank Park (–) || –
|- style="background: 
| 77 || June 24 || @ Phillies || – || || || — || Citizens Bank Park (–) || –
|- style="background: 
| 78 || June 25 || @ Phillies || – || || || — || Citizens Bank Park (–) || –
|- style="background: 
| 79 || June 26 || Brewers || – || || || — || Citi Field (–) || –
|- style="background: 
| 80 || June 27 || Brewers || – || || || — || Citi Field (–) || –
|- style="background: 
| 81 || June 28 || Brewers || – || || || — || Citi Field (–) || –
|- style="background: 
| 82 || June 29 || Brewers || – || || || — || Citi Field (–) || –
|- style="background: 
| 83 || June 30 || Giants || – || || || — || Citi Field (–) || –
|- 
 

|- style="background: 
| 84 || July 1 || Giants || – || || || — || Citi Field (–) || –
|- style="background: 
| 85 || July 2 || Giants || – || || || — || Citi Field (–) || –
|- style="background: 
| 86 || July 4 || @ Diamondbacks || – || || || — || Chase Field (–) || –
|- style="background: 
| 87 || July 5 || @ Diamondbacks || – || || || — || Chase Field (–) || –
|- style="background: 
| 88 || July 6 || @ Diamondbacks || – || || || — || Chase Field (–) || –
|- style="background: 
| 89 || July 7 || @ Padres || – || || || — || Petco Park (–) || –
|- style="background: 
| 90 || July 8 || @ Padres || – || || || — || Petco Park (–) || –
|- style="background: 
| 91 || July 9 || @ Padres || – || || || — || Petco Park (–) || –
|-style=background:#bff
|colspan="10"|93rd All-Star Game in Seattle, Washington
|- style="background: 
| 92 || July 14 || Dodgers || – || || || — || Citi Field (–) || –
|- style="background: 
| 93 || July 15 || Dodgers || – || || || — || Citi Field (–) || –
|- style="background: 
| 94 || July 16 || Dodgers || – || || || — || Citi Field (–) || –
|- style="background: 
| 95 || July 18 || White Sox || – || || || — || Citi Field (–) || –
|- style="background: 
| 96 || July 19 || White Sox || – || || || — || Citi Field (–) || –
|- style="background: 
| 97 || July 20 || White Sox || – || || || — || Citi Field (–) || –
|- style="background: 
| 98 || July 21 || @ Red Sox || – || || || — || Fenway Park (–) || –
|- style="background: 
| 99 || July 22 || @ Red Sox || – || || || — || Fenway Park (–) || –
|- style="background: 
| 100 || July 23 || @ Red Sox || – || || || — || Fenway Park (–) || –
|- style="background: 
| 101 || July 25 || @ Yankees || – || || || — || Yankee Stadium (–) || –
|- style="background: 
| 102 || July 26 || @ Yankees || – || || || — || Yankee Stadium (–) || – 
|- style="background: 
| 103 || July 27 || Nationals || – || || || — || Citi Field (–) || –
|- style="background: 
| 104 || July 28 || Nationals || – || || || — || Citi Field (–) || –
|- style="background: 
| 105 || July 29 || Nationals || – || || || — || Citi Field (–) || –
|- style="background: 
| 106 || July 30 || Nationals || – || || || — || Citi Field (–) || –
|- 
 

|- style="background: 
| 107 || August 1 || @ Royals || – || || || — || Kauffman Stadium (–) || –
|- style="background: 
| 108 || August 2 || @ Royals || – || || || — || Kauffman Stadium (–) || –
|- style="background: 
| 109 || August 3 || @ Royals || – || || || — || Kauffman Stadium (–) || –
|- style="background: 
| 110 || August 4 || @ Orioles || – || || || — || Camden Yards (–) || –
|- style="background: 
| 111 || August 5 || @ Orioles || – || || || — || Camden Yards (–) || –
|- style="background: 
| 112 || August 6 || @ Orioles || – || || || — || Camden Yards (–) || –
|- style="background: 
| 113 || August 7 || Cubs || – || || || — || Citi Field (–) || –
|- style="background: 
| 114 || August 8 || Cubs || – || || || — || Citi Field (–) || –
|- style="background: 
| 115 || August 9 || Cubs || – || || || — || Citi Field (–) || –
|- style="background: 
| 116 || August 11 || Braves || – || || || — || Citi Field (–) || –
|- style="background: 
| 117 || August 12 || Braves || – || || || — || Citi Field (–) || –
|- style="background: 
| 118 || August 13 || Braves || – || || || — || Citi Field (–) || –
|- style="background: 
| 119 || August 14 || Pirates || – || || || — || Citi Field (–) || –
|- style="background: 
| 120 || August 15 || Pirates || – || || || — || Citi Field (–) || –
|- style="background: 
| 121 || August 16 || Pirates || – || || || — || Citi Field (–) || –
|- style="background: 
| 122 || August 17 || @ Cardinals || – || || || — || Busch Stadium (–) || –
|- style="background: 
| 123 || August 18 || @ Cardinals || – || || || — || Busch Stadium (–) || –
|- style="background: 
| 124 || August 19 || @ Cardinals || – || || || — || Busch Stadium (–) || –
|- style="background: 
| 125 || August 20 || @ Cardinals || – || || || — || Busch Stadium (–) || –
|- style="background: 
| 126 || August 21 || @ Braves || – || || || — || Truist Park (–) || –
|- style="background: 
| 127 || August 22 || @ Braves || – || || || — || Truist Park (–) || –
|- style="background: 
| 128 || August 23 || @ Braves || – || || || — || Truist Park (–) || –
|- style="background: 
| 129 || August 25 || Angels || – || || || — || Citi Field (–) || –
|- style="background: 
| 130 || August 26 || Angels || – || || || — || Citi Field (–) || –
|- style="background: 
| 131 || August 27 || Angels || – || || || — || Citi Field (–) || –
|- style="background: 
| 132 || August 28 || Rangers || – || || || — || Citi Field (–) || –
|- style="background: 
| 133 || August 29 || Rangers || – || || || — || Citi Field (–) || –
|- style="background: 
| 134 || August 30 || Rangers || – || || || — || Citi Field (–) || –
|- 
 

|- style="background: 
| 135 || September 1 || Mariners || – || || || — || Citi Field (–) || –
|- style="background: 
| 136 || September 2 || Mariners || – || || || — || Citi Field (–) || –
|- style="background: 
| 137 || September 3 || Mariners || – || || || — || Citi Field (–) || –
|- style="background: 
| 138 || September 5 || @ Nationals || – || || || — || Nationals Park (–) || –
|- style="background: 
| 139 || September 6 || @ Nationals || – || || || — || Nationals Park (–) || –
|- style="background: 
| 140 || September 8 || @ Twins || – || || || — || Target Field (–) || –
|- style="background: 
| 141 || September 9 || @ Twins || – || || || — || Target Field (–) || –
|- style="background: 
| 142 || September 10 || @ Twins || – || || || — || Target Field (–) || –
|- style="background: 
| 143 || September 11 || Diamondbacks || – || || || — || Citi Field (–) || –
|- style="background: 
| 144 || September 12 || Diamondbacks || – || || || — || Citi Field (–) || –
|- style="background: 
| 145 || September 13 || Diamondbacks || – || || || — || Citi Field (–) || –
|- style="background: 
| 146 || September 14 || Diamondbacks || – || || || — || Citi Field (–) || –
|- style="background: 
| 147 || September 15 || Reds || – || || || — || Citi Field (–) || –
|- style="background: 
| 148 || September 16 || Reds || – || || || — || Citi Field (–) || –
|- style="background: 
| 149 || September 17 || Reds || – || || || — || Citi Field (–) || –
|- style="background: 
| 150 || September 18 || @ Marlins || – || || || — || LoanDepot Park (–) || –
|- style="background: 
| 151 || September 19 || @ Marlins || – || || || — || LoanDepot Park (–) || –
|- style="background: 
| 152 || September 20 || @ Marlins || – || || || — || LoanDepot Park (–) || –
|- style="background: 
| 153 || September 21 || @ Phillies || – || || || — || Citizens Bank Park (–) || –
|- style="background: 
| 154 || September 22 || @ Phillies || – || || || — || Citizens Bank Park (–) || –
|- style="background: 
| 155 || September 23 || @ Phillies || – || || || — || Citizens Bank Park (–) || –
|- style="background: 
| 156 || September 24 || @ Phillies || – || || || — || Citizens Bank Park (–) || –
|- style="background: 
| 157 || September 26 || Marlins || – || || || — || Citi Field (–) || –
|- style="background: 
| 158 || September 27 || Marlins || – || || || — || Citi Field (–) || –
|- style="background: 
| 159 || September 28 || Marlins || – || || || — || Citi Field (–) || –
|- style="background: 
| 160 || September 29 || Phillies || – || || || — || Citi Field (–) || –
|- style="background: 
| 161 || September 30 || Phillies || – || || || — || Citi Field (–) || –
|- style="background: 
| 162 || October 1 || Phillies || – || || || — || Citi Field (–) || –
|-

Current roster

Standings

National League East

National League Wild Card

Farm system

Notes

References

External links
 2023 New York Mets season at Baseball Reference

New York Mets seasons
New York Mets season
New York Mets
2020s in Queens
Flushing, Queens